Stenoptilia poculi is a moth of the family Pterophoridae. It is found in Russia (the Caucasus region) and China.

The wingspan is 21–23 mm. Adults have been recorded in July.

References

Moths described in 1998
poculi
Moths of Europe
Moths of Asia